Posse (15 May 1977–after 1991) was an American-bred, British-trained Thoroughbred racehorse and sire. He ran only six times, winning twice, in a racing career which lasted from October 1979 until July 1980. As a three-year-old he was promoted to second after a controversial race for the 2000 Guineas but showed his best form in summer when he established himself as one of the leading milers in Europe with wins in the St James's Palace Stakes and Sussex Stakes. He was retired to stud at the end of the year and had some success as a sire of winners.

Background
Posse was a chestnut horse with a white star, bred in Kentucky by his owner Ogden Mills Phipps. His sire Forli was a champion in his native Argentina before becoming a successful breeding stallion in the United States. His best-known offspring was Forego, the three-time American Horse of the Year, but he was also successful in Europe with hores such as Thatch. His dam, In Hot Pursuit, bred and raced by Phipps, was a leading two-year-old the United States in 1973 when her wins included the Fashion Stakes. She produced several other winners including the Posse's Grade Three winning full-brothers Late As Usual (Swoon's Son Stakes) and Hot Rodder (Oettingen-Rennen). Phipps sent the colt to race in England where he was trained by John Dunlop at Arundel, West Sussex.

Racing career

1979: two-year-old season
Posse made his only appearance as a two-year-old in October 1979 when he contested the Houghton Stakes over seven furlongs at Newmarket Racecourse. Starting at odds of 14/1 he produced a strong late run but showed his inexperience ("ran very green") in the final furlong and finished second, beaten two and a half lengths by the Irish-trained Night Alert with the future Epsom Oaks winner Bireme three lengths back in third.

1980: three-year-old season
On his three-year-old debut, Posse was sent to Newbury Racecourse in England for the Greenham Stakes, an important trial race for the 2000 Guineas. In an exceptionally strong field for a Group Three event he finished strongly to take third, beaten a neck and half a length by Final Straw and 1979's leading juvenile Monteverdi. The Middle Park Stakes winner Known Fact finished fourth with the William Hill Futurity winner Hello Gorgeous in fifth. On 3 May Posse started at odds of 12/1 for the 2000 Guineas over Newmarket's Rowley Mile with the undefeated French colt Nureyev being made the 13/8 favourite. Eddery tracked the leaders on Posse and appeared to have a good chance three furlongs from the finish when he was badly hampered and almost fell when Philippe Paquet on Nureyev barged his was through the centre of the field to make his challenge. Posse recovered well and made up a great deal of ground in the final furlong to finish third, beaten a neck and three-quarters of a length by Nureyev and Known Fact. An inquiry by the racecourse stewards ruled that Paquet had been guilty of "reckless" riding and, under the rules of racing at the time, had no option but to disqualify the favourite and relegate him to last place. The race was awarded to Known Fact, with Posse being promoted to second. Two weeks later, Posse started 7/2 second favourite behind Monteverdi for the Irish 2,000 Guineas at the Curragh, despite having performed poorly in a training gallop. He appeared the likely winner two furlongs from the finish but eventually finished fourth behind Nikoli, Last Fandango and Final Straw, beaten less than a length. While some observers felt that Posse had failed through lack of courage, Timeform suggested that the colt had not recovered sufficiently from his exertions at Newmarket.

Posse reappeared in the St James's Palace Stakes at Royal Ascot in June. Shortly before the race a half-share in the colt was sold for $1 million to the Derisley Wood Stud, despite the fact that he was still a maiden after four races. At Ascot he was again opposed by Last Fandango and Final Straw, but the lightly-raced Dalsaan was made the odds-on favourite, with Posse starting the 11/2 third choice in the betting. Eddery rode the colt with great confidence, restraining him towards the back of the field and he was still only in fifth place with a furlong and a half to run. Posse then moved up on the outside, and produced what Timeform described as a "dazzling turn of speed" to overtake Final Straw well inside the final furlong and win very easily by one and a half lengths. In the Sussex Stakes at Goodwood Racecourse in July, Posse was matched against older horses for the first time, but Final Straw appeared to be his most serious opponent and he was made the 8/13 favourite. Eddery again held the colt up for a late challenge but in the straight he appeared unlikely to obtain a clear run as he was trapped on the inside. In the closing stages Posse was switched to the outside and again produced a striking burst of acceleration to catch Final Straw in the last stride and win by a head. There was considerable anticipation of a race between Posse and either Known Fact or Kris the leading miler of 1979, both of whom had missed the summer with training problems. Shortly after his win at Goodwood however, Posse contracted a respiratory infection from which he failed to recover sufficiently for him to take part in the major autumn races. He did not run again and was retired to the Derisley Wood Stud.

Assessment
In 1979, the independent Timeform organisation gave Posse a rating of 108 p, the "p" indicating that he was likely to make more than the normal improvement between two and three years of age. The prediction proved true as Posse was rated 130 by Timeform in 1980, seven pounds below their top-rated horse Moorestyle. In the official International Classification he was rated the fifth-best three-year-old colt in Europe behind Moorestyle, Argument, Known Fact and Nureyev, and the ninth-best horse of any age.

Stud record
Posse began his stud career in England where he was based for six years before being exported to Japan. Despite the fact that he had been known as a miler, Posse's offspring tended to thrive over longer distances. The best of his progeny was probably Sheriff's Star, who won the Coronation Cup and the Grand Prix de Saint-Cloud as a four-year-old in 1989. Other good winners included Sally Brown, Altayan (Prix Maurice de Nieuil) and Linpac West (John Porter Stakes). Through his daughter Batave, Posse was the damsire of the leading miler Bigstone. Posse was "put out of stud" in Japan on 11 January 1991.

Pedigree

References

1977 racehorse births
Racehorses bred in Kentucky
Racehorses trained in the United Kingdom
Thoroughbred family 8-h